Tanjung Dawai is a small town in Kuala Muda District, Kedah, Malaysia.

Kuala Muda District
Towns in Kedah